Trofimov (feminine form: Trofimova) is a Russian family name derived from the first name Trofim and literally meaning "Trofim's". The Ukrainian-language form is transliterated in the same as Russian; the Belarusian-language form is Trafimau/Trafimaw.

The surname may refer to the following notable people.

A
 Aleksandr Trofimov (actor) (born 1952), Soviet and Russian actor
 Aleksandr Trofimov (footballer) (1937–2002), Soviet and Azerbaijani footballer
Anatoly Trofimov (1940−2005), deputy director of the Russian Federal Security Service
Andrei Trofimov (disambiguation), several people

B
 (b. 1938), Soviet chemist

K
 (1921−1987), Soviet general

M
Mikhail Trofimov (born 1974), Russian professional football player

N
Nina Gopova-Trofimova (b. 1953), Soviet sprint canoer
Nikolay Trofimov (1920–2005), Soviet actor

R
Roman Sergeevich Trofimov (b. 1989), Russian ski jumper

S
Sergei Trofimov (b. 1966), Russian singer-songwriter

U
Ulyana Trofimova (b. 1990), Uzbekistani rhythmic gymnast

V
Vasili Trofimov (1919–1999), Soviet football (soccer) and hockey player, multiple USSR champion
Vikentii Trofimov (1878–1956), Russian painter
Viktor Trofimov (1938–2013), former Soviet international speedway rider 
Vladimir Trofimov, Russian speedway sportsman

Y
Yaroslav Trofimov (b. 1969), award-winning author and journalist
Yuri Trofimov (born 1984), Russian road bicycle racer

Z
 (1897–1961), Soviet general

Russian-language surnames
Patronymic surnames
Surnames from given names